Paul Verlaine University – Metz (Université Paul Verlaine - Metz, or UPV-M) was a French university, based in Metz.  It merged with Nancy-I, Nancy-II, and the INPL forming the University of Lorraine. The merger process started in 2009 with the creation of a "pôles de recherche et d'enseignement supérieur" or PRES and was completed 1 January 2012.

See also
 List of public universities in France by academy

Defunct universities and colleges in France
Universities and colleges in Metz
Educational institutions established in 1970
1970 establishments in France
Educational institutions disestablished in 2011
2011 disestablishments in France
University of Lorraine